Charlotte Mary Hood, Baroness Bridport, 3rd Duchess of Bronte (née Nelson; 20 September 1787 – 29 January 1873) was the daughter of William Nelson, 1st Earl Nelson and Sarah Yonge. She died at the age of 85 in Cricket St. Thomas, Somerset, England. She was buried in Cricket St. Thomas, Somerset.

She succeeded to the title of Duchess of Bronte (of the Kingdom of Two Sicilies) on 28 February 1835.

Marriage and children
She married Samuel Hood, 2nd Baron Bridport, son of Henry Hood, 2nd Viscount Hood and Jane Wheler, on 3 July 1810. They had seven children:

 Hon. Mary Sophia Hood (b. 1 December 1811, d. 29 January 1888)
 Hon. Charlotte Hood (b. 8 August 1813, d. 21 August 1906)
 Hon. Jane Sarah Hood (b. 14 January 1817, d. 28 April 1907)
 Hon. Catherine Louisa Hood (b. 25 March 1818, d. 6 October 1893)
 Hon. Frances Caroline Hood (b. 29 March 1821, d. 1 October 1903), wife of Sir John Walrond, 1st Baronet.
 General Sir Alexander Hood, 1st Viscount Bridport of Cricket St. Thomas (b. 23 December 1814, d. 4 June 1904)
 Hon. Horatio Nelson Hood (b. 24 April 1826, d. 1832)

References 

1787 births
1873 deaths
Irish baronesses
Daughters of British earls
Charlotte